Dordogne's 4th constituency is one of four French legislative constituencies in the department of Dordogne. It is currently represented by Sébastien Peytavie of Génération.s (G.s).

Historic representation

Elections

2022

 
 
 
 
 
 
 
 
|-
| colspan="8" bgcolor="#E9E9E9"|
|-
 
 

 
 
 
 
 

* LREM dissident** PS dissident

2017

2012
Germinal Peiro obtained over 50% of the vote in the first round, with a vote that was more than 25% of the eligible voters in the constituency, so was elected in the first round.

References

External links 
Results of legislative elections from 2002 to 2017 by constituency (Ministry of the Interior) 
Results of legislative elections from 1958 to 2012 by constituency (CDSP Sciences Po) 
Results of elections from 1958 to present by constituency (data.gouv.fr) 

4